Joshua Emmanuel Akognon (born February 10, 1986) is a Nigerian–American professional basketball player who last played for Montakit Fuenlabrada of the Liga ACB. He played college basketball for Washington State and Cal State Fullerton.

High school career
Casa Grande High School in Petaluma, California. Akognon along with European standout Angelo Tsagarakis led Casa Grande to the best season in school history in 2003, forming one of the best duos in Northern California basketball history. He was recruited to play for the Cougars of Washington State University, who were then coached by Dick Bennett.

College career

Sophomore season
Akognon began the season as a starter but was soon relegated to a role off the bench.

An ankle injury to starter Derrick Low forced Akognon to play more, and he responded by scoring 27 points, including the game-winning three-pointer and clinching free throws, in a 78–71 upset of Brandon Roy-led Washington. Akognon earned Pac-10 player of the week honors and followed that game with 25 points against the UCLA Bruins at Pauley Pavilion; most of the points came against Arron Afflalo.

He earned Pontiac Pac-10 Player Honors for his winning second-half performance against the USC Trojans.  Josh was also voted the Pac-10's "Most Underrated Player" in an article that ran in Sports Illustrated. Akognon led the team in scoring despite coming off the bench most of the year. Akognon transferred to Cal State Fullerton where he was eligible to play for two years at the beginning of the 2007–08 season.

Junior season
Akognon averaged 20.2 points a game and scored in double figures 28 of 31 games, making at least one three-pointer in all but two games, at least four three-pointers in 18 of 31 games and reaching 20 points in 17 of 31 games. Josh also reached the 30-point mark five times, including a 31-point effort in the NCAA Tournament against Wisconsin.

Despite an injury to his shooting hand suffered against UC-Davis, Akognon shot just under 40% from three-point range and 90% from the free throw line.  Josh made 116 three-pointers and 107 free throws, a 100–100 combination matched by only seven players. Akognon also doubled his career-high in steals and reached 1,000 points for his college career.

Akognon's junior season also saw him achieve team and individual honors, with California State University, Fullerton tying for the regular-season title, winning the Big West Tournament and reaching the NCAA Tournament for the first time in 30 years with a 24–9 record. Akognon was a first team selection at the Shamrock Holiday Classic at St. Mary's, named Mid Majority Baller of the Week, named to the All-District 15 Second Team by the NABC with such players as O. J. Mayo and Kevin Love, a second team Big West selection and named MVP of the Big West Tournament where he averaged 20 points per game and hit 12 three-pointers in three games. Akognon was also named the 2007–2008 Africa Basket Player of the Year. Akognon announced on April 18 he was making himself eligible for the NBA Draft; after testing the waters and holding his own against some of the top 2008 draft prospects, Akognon decided on June 16 to return to the orange-and-blue for his senior season.

Senior season
While from a team standpoint the Titans failed to match their 2007–08 success, Akognon performed brilliantly in the face of countless, hounding defenses designed to slow him down.  Josh was named the 2008–09 Big West Conference Men's Basketball Player of the Year, averaging 23.9 points per game, good for 8th in the nation.  Akognon broke the single season scoring record of former Titan and U.S. Olympian Leon Wood with 764 points, finished seventh overall in Titan history with 1,411 points and established a two-year scoring record for his exploits.  Josh was also named to the NABC All-District 9 First Team, the only Big West player named to the team this year.  Once again Akognon reached the 100–100 mark with 136 three-pointers (2nd best in the nation per game) and 132 free throws (8th best in the nation with 89.2% FT percentage).  Only six other players achieved that 100–100 combination.  Akognon ended the season with the longest current streak in the nation of 44 games with a made three-pointer.  He finished his college career with 1,805 points and 335 three-pointers.  Josh also set a Big West Tournament scoring record with 37 points in a first round win over UC Riverside that included 9 three-pointers.  Akognon reached double figures in 36 of 37 games, reached the 20 point mark twenty-two times, the 30+ point mark 6 times, and has had two 41 point games.  He was also one of 50 players on the early season watch list for the James Naismith Award (given to the top player in college basketball), and named to the early season list for the Bob Cousy Award (given to the top point guard in college basketball).

Professional career

2009–10 season
After going undrafted in the 2009 NBA draft, Akognon signed a contract with the Estonian team BC Kalev/Cramo for the 2009–10 season.

2010–11 season
In 2010, Akognon joined the Dongguan Leopards of the Chinese Basketball Association (CBA) for the 2010–11 season. Akognon took the CBA by storm, averaging over 29 points in his first season and enabling DongGuan to almost double its win total from the previous year, improving to a 25–7 third-place finish in the league compared to a 13–19 record from the previous year. Akognon scored in double figures every game and had 18 20-point games, 12 30-point games, 4 40-point games and a career-high 54 point effort. He led Dongguan to a first-round victory in the CBA playoffs before falling to rival Guangdong in the semifinals. Throughout the season, Akognon displayed his scoring, dribbling, creativity and playmaking ability, delighting fans across the Chinese mainland.

2011–12 season
In 2011, Akognon re-signed with the Leopards and averaged over 28 points a game in 2011–12 which was good enough to be the fifth leading scorer in the CBA.  Most experts and writers expected Dongguan to be in a rebuilding mode and the team lost their first four games. Due to Akognon's strong play and leadership, Dongguan rallied to go 19–9 over the last 28 games and finished in 5th place. He carried his team in their exciting five-game series against Xinjiang and Ike Diogu, but fell up short losing Game 5 and the series 3–2.  Due to the lockout, the CBA was flooded with NBA players like J.R. Smith and Wilson Chandler. Despite the influx of pro talent, Akognon continued his strong play and confirmed his standing as one of the most outstanding players in the CBA.

On March 30, 2012, he was acquired by the Canton Charge following the conclusion of the 2011–12 CBA season. On April 17, 2012, he was waived by the Charge due to injury.

2012–13 season
Akognon joined the Sacramento Kings for the 2012 NBA Summer League. On September 27, 2012, he signed with the Dallas Mavericks. However, he was later waived by the Mavericks on October 19, 2012. In November 2012, he joined Liaoning of China for the 2012–13 season.

On April 3, 2013, he signed a 10-day contract with the Mavericks. On April 13, 2013, he signed with the Mavericks for the rest of the season.

2013–14 season
Akognon joined the Mavericks for the 2013 NBA Summer League. On July 21, 2013, he was waived by the Mavericks. Three days later, he was claimed off waivers by the Memphis Grizzlies. On October 6, 2013, he was waived by the Grizzlies.

In November 2013, he joined the Qingdao DoubleStar Eagles of China for the 2013–14 season. On February 17, 2014, he left China and returned to the United States. Four days later, he was acquired by the Delaware 87ers.

2014–15 season
On September 18, 2014, he signed a contract with the Foshan Dralions for the 2014–15 CBA season.

On March 4, 2015, he signed a contract with the Serbian team Partizan Belgrade until the end of the season. On April 23, 2015, he parted ways with Partizan.

2015–16 season
On December 8, 2015, Akognon returned to China, this time with the Jilin Northeast Tigers. On February 2, he signed with Dinamo Sassari of Italy for the rest of the season.

2016–17 season
On October 2, 2016, Akognon signed a one-month deal with Baskonia of the Liga ACB. The club rescinded his contract on 6 November 2016. On November 22, he signed with the Lithuanian club Lietuvos rytas. On January 21, 2017, he parted ways with Rytas.

In April, 2017, Akognon signed with Henan of China for the 2017 NBL season.

2017–18 season
On January 12, 2018, Akognon signed with Iberostar Tenerife for the rest of the 2017–18 season.

International career
Akognon was part of the Nigeria national basketball team that competed in the 2006 FIBA World Championship in Japan. He also played at the 2016 Summer Olympics and was one of the team's leaders with averages of 10.6 points, 1.6 rebounds and 1.8 assists per game.

Career statistics

NBA

Regular season

|-
| align="left" | 
| align="left" | Dallas
| 3 || 0 || 3.0 || .500 || .500 || .000 || .3 || .3 || .0 || .0 || 1.7
|-
| align="left" | Career
| align="left" | 
| 3 || 0 || 3.0 || .500 || .500 || .000 || .3 || .3 || .0 || .0 || 1.7

References

External links

Josh Akognon at acb.com 
Josh Akongon at fiba.com
Josh Akognon at eurobasket.com
Josh Akognon at euroleague.net
Josh Akognon at legabasket.it 
Josh Akognon at fullertontitans.cstv.com
Josh Akognon at wsucougars.cstv.com

1986 births
Living people
2006 FIBA World Championship players
ABA League players
African-American basketball players
American expatriate basketball people in China
American expatriate basketball people in Estonia
American expatriate basketball people in Italy
American expatriate basketball people in Lithuania
American expatriate basketball people in Serbia
American expatriate basketball people in Spain
American sportspeople of Nigerian descent
American men's basketball players
Basketball League of Serbia players
Basketball players at the 2016 Summer Olympics
Basketball players from California
BC Kalev/Cramo players
BC Rytas players
Cal State Fullerton Titans men's basketball players
Canton Charge players
Dallas Mavericks players
Delaware 87ers players
Dinamo Sassari players
Guangzhou Loong Lions players
Jilin Northeast Tigers players
KK Partizan players
Korvpalli Meistriliiga players
Lega Basket Serie A players
Liaoning Flying Leopards players
Liga ACB players
Nigerian expatriate basketball people in Serbia
Nigerian men's basketball players
Olympic basketball players of Nigeria
People from Greenbrae, California
People from Petaluma, California
Point guards
Qingdao Eagles players
Saski Baskonia players
Shanghai Sharks players
Shenzhen Leopards players
Sportspeople from the San Francisco Bay Area
Undrafted National Basketball Association players
Washington State Cougars men's basketball players
21st-century African-American sportspeople
20th-century African-American people